Lycogalopsis is a genus of puffball fungi in the family Agaricaceae. It was circumscribed by mycologist Eduard Fischer in 1886, with L. solmsii as the type species.

See also
List of Agaricaceae genera
List of Agaricales genera

References

Agaricaceae
Agaricales genera